Saint Christopher Academy is the only private and diocesan school in the town of Bangar, La Union, Philippines.  The school has complete grade school levels, and high school levels.

History 
Saint Christopher Academy is the only private diocesan school and also the oldest school in Bangar, La Union, it was founded in 1945 by the late Rev. Fr. Mariano Singson.  The school is named after the patron saint of the town, Saint Christopher.  Initially the school served only high school students.  In 1984 it opened a pre-school department, which offers Nursery and Kindergarten levels.  In 1987, the pre-school department expanded into an elementary department.  The elementary department offered grade one class during School Year 1987-88 until all levels were completed.  The first batch of graduates graduated in 1994.

Schools in La Union
Educational institutions established in 1945
1945 establishments in the Philippines